The following is a list of painters in the Hudson River School, a mid-19th-century American art movement. The movement was led by a group of landscape painters whose aesthetic vision was influenced by romanticism. Some of these artists are also considered luminists, a related movement in mid-19th-century American painting that was characterized in the twentieth century. Their paintings depict the Hudson River Valley and the surrounding area, as well as the Catskill Mountains, Adirondack Mountains, and White Mountains of New Hampshire. Note that "school" in this sense refers to a group of people whose outlook, inspiration, output, or style demonstrates a common thread, rather than a learning institution.

List 
Artists are listed alphabetically by surname.

References 

American artists
 
Luminism (American art style)
Cultural history of the United States
Lists of painters